The women's 200 metre backstroke competition at the 2006 Pan Pacific Swimming Championships took place on August 19 at the Saanich Commonwealth Place.  The last champion was Margaret Hoelzer of US.

This race consisted of four lengths of the pool, all in backstroke.

Records
Prior to this competition, the existing world and Pan Pacific records were as follows:

Results
All times are in minutes and seconds.

Heats
The first round was held on August 19, at 11:01.

B Final 
The B final was held on August 19, at 19:19.

A Final 
The A final was held on August 19, at 19:19.

References

2006 Pan Pacific Swimming Championships
2006 in women's swimming